La Méditerranéenne, previously known as Tour Méditerranéen, is a professional road bicycle racing event held in Spain, France and Italy, close to the Mediterranean. Run over four days, it holds a 2.1 rating on the UCI Europe Tour.

The event is part of a series of stage races being held in the south of France in February, alongside the Étoile de Bessèges, the Tour du Haut Var and the Tour La Provence. These early-season races are competed mainly by French teams and are considered preparations for Paris–Nice, the first European World Tour event in March.

History
The Tour Méditerranéen ("Tour of the Mediterranean Sea") was created by former Tour de France winner Lucien Aimar in 1974. The event was named Trophée Méditerranéen for its first four editions. Run in February, the five-day stage race was won by several eminent riders, including Eddy Merckx, Gianni Bugno, Tony Rominger, Laurent Jalabert and  Paolo Bettini. Gerrie Knetemann holds the record with three victories.

In 2012 licensing problems between the organizers and the French Cycling Federation emerged, nearly spelling the cancellation of the event before a deal was ultimately reached. Financial difficulties led to the discontinuation of the race in 2015 after organizers failed to pay debts from the previous edition.

In 2016 the race was revived as La Méditerranéenne and scaled back to four days. The rejuvenated edition was won by Ukrainian Andriy Hrivko.

Route
From 1974 until 2014 the race was held in the southern French region of Provence-Alpes-Côte d'Azur, but also occasionally featured stages in Liguria, Italy. Traditionally, a summit finish on the Mont Faron in Toulon was staged every year. As from 2016, the re-invented La Méditerranéenne is contested over four days. The 2016 edition spanned three countries, starting with a team time trial in Banyoles, Spain, before heading into France for two stages close to the Mediterranean coast. The final stage started and finished in Bordighera, on the Italian riviera.

Winners

Tour Méditerranéen

La Méditerranéenne

References

External links
  

UCI Europe Tour races
Cycle races in France
Mediterranean
Recurring sporting events established in 1974
1974 establishments in France
2016 disestablishments in France
Recurring sporting events disestablished in 2016
Defunct cycling races in France